Highland Secondary School is a secondary school located in Comox, British Columbia, Canada in School District 71.  The school opened in 1978 and educates approximately 650 students annually in grades 8–12. The school's sports teams all go by the name of the Highland Raiders.

Students are separated into two school houses, which are colour-coded as gold and blue respectively. Each house has their own advisory system made up of groups whose names correspond to their colour and number (G-15, B-6,etc.). Every student attends their advisory group ("AG") for 10 minutes daily after their first class.

As of 2012 the International Baccalaureate (IB) program was implemented into the school.

Notable graduates
 Pamela Anderson, actress
 Cassie Sharpe, athlete
 Jody Wilson-Raybould, politician

External links
 Highland Secondary School

Educational institutions established in 1978
High schools in British Columbia
1978 establishments in British Columbia